Tacius Golding (8 November 1900 – 6 October 1995) was a Jamaican politician, born in Bellas Gate, St. Catherine, Jamaica. He was elected as a member of the House of Representatives in 1949, and he served continuously until 1972. He was Speaker of the House from 1962 to 1967. A school is named after him in Jamaica. His son, Bruce Golding, was Jamaica's 8th Prime Minister. He died in 1995.

The Tacius Golding School was named after Golding.

See also
List of speakers of the House of Representatives of Jamaica

References

Speakers of the House of Representatives of Jamaica
1900 births
1995 deaths
People from Saint Catherine Parish
Jamaica Labour Party politicians